Arturo Bandini may refer to:
 An album by Züri West
 Arturo Gabriel Bandini, the main character and alter ego of John Fante in his four 'Bandini' novels
 Arturo Bandini (One Life to Live), a fictional character from the American soap opera, One Life to Live

See also 
 Bandini (disambiguation)

Bandini, Arturo